Matthew Hastings is an American physicist, currently a Principal Researcher at Microsoft. Previously, he was a professor at Duke University and a research scientist at the Center for Nonlinear Studies and Theoretical Division, Los Alamos National Laboratory. He received his PhD in Physics at MIT, in 1997, under Leonid Levitov.

While Hastings primarily works in quantum information science, he has made contributions to a range of topics in physics and related fields.

He proved an extension of the Lieb-Schultz-Mattis theorem (see Lieb-Robinson bounds) to dimensions greater than one, providing foundational mathematical insights into topological quantum computing.

He disproved the additivity conjecture for the classical capacity of quantum channels, a long standing open problem in quantum Shannon theory.

Awards and honours
He is invited to speak at the 2022 International Congress of Mathematicians in St. Petersburg in the mathematical physics section.

Publications 
 List of publications on arXiv
 List of Publications at Microsoft

References

Year of birth missing (living people)
Living people
21st-century American physicists